Bassendean railway station is a Transperth station located in Bassendean,   north-east of Perth railway station, on the Midland Line.

History
In August 1906 a deputation from the West Guildford Roads Board spoke with the Minister for Railways JW Langsford, the minister was under the impression that the group were there to push for a station halfway between Guildford and Bayswater stations. The Minister explained that the Commissioner Mr George was opposed to a station at that location. Mr Georges had found that there was a requirement for a station one mile from Guildford and that the Commissioner would visit the spot to see for himself. In July 1907 sort another deputation from the Roads Board, local MLA Mr Johnson said he had already spoken with the Minister for railways who had agreed to visit the district.

The station opened in 1910 as West Guildford, being renamed in 1922. Upgrade works commenced in 2003 with the original building demolished and replaced at a cost of $5 million. On 31 May 2004, the upgraded station was opened by state Minister for Planning and Infrastructure Alannah MacTiernan. It is a part of the Public Transport Authority's Building Better Stations program.

Rail services
Bassendean railway station is served by the Midland railway line on the Transperth network. This line goes between Midland railway station and Perth railway station. Midland line trains stop at the station every 10 minutes during peak on weekdays, and every 15 minutes during the day outside peak every day of the year except Christmas Day. Trains are half-hourly or hourly at night time. The station saw 793,718 passengers in the 2013-14 financial year.

Bus routes

See also
Path Transit
Swan Transit

References

Midland line, Perth
Railway stations in Australia opened in 1910
Railway stations in Perth, Western Australia
Bassendean, Western Australia
Bus stations in Perth, Western Australia